Hartebeeskop, officially Etjelembube is a town in Gert Sibande District Municipality in the Mpumalanga province of South Africa. It is situated close to the western border of eSwatini.

References

Populated places in the Albert Luthuli Local Municipality